Central High is an unincorporated community in Cherokee County, located in the U.S. state of Texas. According to the Handbook of Texas, the community had a population of 30 in 2000. It is located within the Tyler-Jacksonville combined statistical area.

History
The area in what is known as Central High today was first settled in the early 1900s. It had a store and a Baptist church in 1919. The community center opened on May 12, 1963. Its population was only 30 in 2000.

Geography

Education
Mt. Zion, Nip 'N Tuck, and Sand Flat schools voted to come together as one due to the large increase in population in the area. They became known as the Central High Independent School District, the first district in Cherokee County. Ike Martin donated  of land for a two-story building in 1916. Central High School was opened that next year and became the community's focal point. It served children in the area who were in first through tenth grades and had around 225 students in the 1927-1928 school year. A tornado destroyed a portion of the school in 1931, but it was rebuilt thanks to WPA labor. In 1952, it joined the Alto Independent School District. The Central High Community Organization was founded in 1962 to purchase the school and land from nearby Alto. The building was restored and has since become a community center, with the Texas Extension Education Association holding meetings there every third Wednesday of each month. Some of its members were alumni of the school. It hosts an annual homecoming for former students and residents on the first Sunday each May.

Notes

Unincorporated communities in Cherokee County, Texas
Unincorporated communities in Texas